WLA may refer to:
Airwaves Airlink (ICAO: WLA), a Zambian airline
Harley-Davidson WLA, a motorcycle produced during World War 2
Washington Library Association
Weak-Link Approach, a molecular assembly methodology
West Los Angeles, Los Angeles, California, a region within the Westside of Los Angeles County, a much larger area often referred to by the same name
Western Lacrosse Association, a Senior A box lacrosse league in British Columbia, Canada
White Ladies Aston, a village and civil parish in Worcestershire, England
Winnebago Lutheran Academy, a Lutheran high school in Fond du Lac, Wisconsin
Wisconsin Library Association
Wyoming Library Association
Women's Land Army, the name for several groups of women recruited in wartime to work in agriculture
Workload Automation, an Information Technology tool used to automate IT and business processes.
World Literature Assignment 1 and 2 in IB Group 1 subjects in the IB Diploma Programme